USS Plainview (AGEH–1) was, in its time, the world's largest hydrofoil. Named after the cities of Plainview, New York and Plainview, Texas, she was also the United States Navy's first hydrofoil research ship. Plainview was designed under project SCB 219; laid down 8 May 1964 by the Lockheed Shipbuilding and Construction Company, Seattle, Washington; launched 28 June 1965; sponsored by Mrs. John T. Hayward; and placed in service on 3 March 1969.  She cost $21 million to construct.

Foilborne propulsion consisted of two General Electric LM1500 free-turbine turboshaft engines, derivatives of the J79 turbojets used in the F-4 Phantom aircraft, but during conventional (hull borne) operations she was driven by two diesel engines. Her homeport was Bremerton, Washington. Plainview carried out long range experimental programs to evaluate the design principles of hydrofoils and to develop and evaluate tactics and doctrine for hydrofoils, particularly in anti-submarine warfare, and helped to determine the feasibility of hydrofoil operations in high seas.

Plainview was decommissioned at 10:30 am, 22 September 1978, at Pier 7, Puget Sound Naval Shipyard. Struck from the Naval Vessel Register on 30 September 1978, Plainview was sold for scrapping by the Defense Reutilization and Marketing Service (DRMS) on 1 July 1979 to General Metals (now Schnitzer Metals) on the Hylebos Waterway, Tacoma, Washington. She was partially scrapped in 2004. , she lies abandoned on mudflats, on private property, near Astoria, Oregon. In 2019, the Washington Department of Natural Resources expressed concerns about Plainview derelict hull leaking pollutants into the environment.

Plainview traveled on her foils for a total of 268 hours, over her entire lifetime.

See also
 List of auxiliaries of the United States Navy
 
 Boeing hydrofoils

References

Notes

Sources

Further reading
 December 1968 Popular Mechanics page 88-90-91 "The Biggest Fastest Flying Boat Yet" words by Bob Zimmerman ; Technical Art Concept (cut away labeled) Fred Wolff available via Google Books.

External links
 1968 film at British Movietone Digital Archive
 1969 film at British Movietone Digital Archive
 The Ship that Flew

Experimental ships of the United States Navy
Ships built by Lockheed Shipbuilding and Construction Company
1965 ships
Hydrofoils of the United States
Shipwrecks of the Washington coast